Forst is an Italian brewing company, based in Forst (Italian: Foresta), a frazione (municipal subdivision) of Algund (Italian: Lagundo), South Tyrol. The brewery was founded in 1857 by two entrepreneurs, Johann Wallnöfer and Franz Tappeiner, from Meran (Italian: Merano). Later in 1863, the company passed to the entrepreneur Josef Fuchs, who enlarged the plant in Forst. In 2004, Forst opened a small microbrewery in Forst, Germany.

Operations 
Forst has an annual production of 700,000 hl, serving primarily the domestic market. In 1991, it acquired the Menabrea brewery in Biella, Piedmont and also maintains a bottling plant in Palermo, Sicily. The company also produces mineral water and other non-alcoholic drinks, through a subsidiary named Kaiserwasser.

References

External links

 Official website
 Forst Beer Garden

Beer brands of Italy
Beer in Italy
Manufacturing companies based in South Tyrol
Food and drink companies established in 1857
Italian companies established in 1857